The Way Life Goes may refer to:
The Way Life Goes (album), a 2013 album by Tom Keifer
"The Way Life Goes" (song), a 2017 song by Lil Uzi Vert